The Sihásapa or Blackfoot Sioux are a division  of the Lakota people, Titonwan, or Teton.

Sihásapa is the Lakota word for "Blackfoot", whereas Siksiká has the same meaning in the Blackfoot language. As a result, the Sihásapa have the same English name as the Blackfoot Confederacy,  and the nations are sometimes confused with one another.

The Sihásapa lived in the western Dakotas on the Great Plains, and consequently are among the Plains Indians. Their official residence today is the Standing Rock Reservation in North and South Dakota and the Cheyenne River Reservation in South Dakota, home also to the Itazipco (No Bows), the Minneconjou (People Who Live Near Water) and Oohenumpa (Two Kettle), all bands of the Lakota.

Bands
In 1880, John Grass provided a list of the bands (tiyóšpaye) of the Sihasapa:

Sihasapa-Hkcha or Sihasapa qtca (“Real Blackfoot”)
Kangi-shun Pegnake or Kanxicu pegnake (“Crow Feather Hair Ornaments” or “Wear raven feathers in their hair”)
Glaglahecha or Glagla heca (“Slovenly”, “untidy” or “Too lazy to tie their moccasins”)
Wazhazha or Wajaje (“Osage”), Kill Eagle’s Band
Hohe (“Rebels, i.e. Assiniboine”)
Wamnuga Owin or Wamnugaoin (“Cowrie-Shell Earrings” or “Shell ear ornaments or Pendants”)

Famous Sihásapa
 Charging Thunder (1877–1929). Traveled to Salford, England at age twenty-six as part of Buffalo Bill's Wild West Show in 1903 and remained in London when the show left town. He married Josephine, an American horse trainer who had just given birth to their first child, Bessie, and together they settled in Darwen, before moving to Gorton. His name was changed to George Edward Williams, after registering with the British authorities to enable him to find work. Williams worked at the Belle Vue Zoo as an elephant keeper for many years. He died from pneumonia at age fifty-two on July 28, 1929. His interment was in Gorton's Cemetery.
 John Grass
 Kill Eagle
 Crawler

Notes

References
Anderson, Harry H. "An Investigation of the Early Bands of the Saone Group of Teton Sioux." Washington Academy of Sciences Journal 46, no. 3 (1956): 87-94.
Robinson, Doane. "A History of the Dakota or Sioux Indians from Their Earliest Traditions and First Contact with White Men to the Final Settlement of the Last of Them Upon Reservations and Consequent Abandonment of the Old Tribal Life." South Dakota Historical Collections 2, Part 2 (1904): 1-523.

External links